Frederick Lewis Lewton (1874–1959) was an American botanist, chemist, museum curator, archivist, and historian.

At the age of two, Lewton moved with his family to Winter Park, Florida. He studied from 1886 to 1890 at Rollins College. After attending an engineering school in Philadelphia for a year, he transferred to Drexel University. For some time he worked in Florida and briefly worked in Baltimore. From October 1895 to June 1896 he worked at Drexel University as an instructor in chemistry and a laboratory assistant in both chemistry and physics. In June 1896, Lewton became an economic botanist at the Philadelphia Commercial Museum. There he investigated over 500 specimens of gums and resins to determine their chemical compositions, solubilities, and botanical affiliations. This research was published in German and American scientific journals.

Lewton and his first wife, Emilie Hempel Lewton (1875–1929), were married for thirty years and had four daughters. He and his second wife moved to Florida. From 1954 until his death in 1959 he worked as a part-time archivist and historian at Rollins College.

Lewton did research and wrote reports on strains of cotton which are resistant to boll-weevil infestation. His article The Servant in the House: A Brief History of the Sewing Machine is noteworthy in the history of technology.

References

1874 births
1959 deaths
George Washington University alumni
19th-century American botanists
20th-century American botanists